ABL Space Systems is an American private company, based in El Segundo, California, undertaking launch vehicle and launch systems technology development using CNC and 3D printing and minimized launch operations. The company manufactures its components in the United States.

Harry O'Hanley is the chief executive officer (CEO) and Dan Piemont is the chief financial officer (CFO) of ABL Space Systems.

History 
ABL Space Systems was founded in 2017 by Harry O'Hanley and Dan Piemont, former SpaceX and Morgan Stanley employees. Their RS-1 rocket has two stages.

In 2018, ABL Space Systems signed a lease with Camden County, Georgia, for future operations in Spaceport Camden.

In 2019, the company signed with Spaceport America in New Mexico to locate some ABL testing operations and facilities there. As of October 2022, the company makes no mention of this location on their facility list.

As of 2023, ABL is working on a larger rocket to compete for National Security Space Launch contracts.

Testing 
In 2019, ABL Space conducted testing of the E2 rocket engine at the company's test facilities at Spaceport America, New Mexico, which "provided the perfect location and support staff for us to test the E2 rocket engine". The test was considered a success.

In early 2020, the Air Force Research Laboratory (AFRL) joined with ABL Space Systems to test and develop rocket-propulsion components. In October 2020, the second stage with E2 engine was tested at Edwards Air Force Base.

On 19 January 2022, an anomaly during testing at Mojave Air and Space Port resulted in the destruction of the second stage of the RS1 rocket. On 27 January, the source of the anomaly was publicly identified by ABL's CEO Harry O'Hanley as being one of the second stage's E2 Vacuum engine's turbopumps suffering a hard start, which led to a "substantial fire on the aft end of the vehicle, resulting in a complete failure about 20 seconds later".

After three earlier attempts to launch their RS1 rocket in December 2022, ABL shifted the launch attempt to January 2023. The maiden flight on January 10, 2023, failed.

Planned launches sites

St. Marys, Georgia – launch site 
In 2018, ABL contracted with the city of St. Marys, Georgia, in Camden County to use the former St. Marys Airport (FAA LID: 4J6) as a launch site.

Pacific Spaceport Complex 
The first RS1 flight was planned for 2022 from the Pacific Spaceport Complex on Kodiak Island, but the launch attempt failed with no rocket actually launched. After two additional launch attempt failures (no rockets launched), the first launch occurred on January 10, 2023. The maiden flight also failed and did not reach orbit.

Cape Canaveral 
On 1 November 2021, Amazon announced that the first two prototype satellites of the Kuiper constellation, KuiperSat-1 and KuiperSat-2, would be launched using RS1 in the fourth quarter of 2022 from Launch Complex 48 at the Kennedy Space Center. Amazon subsequently shifted these satellites to Vulcan Centaur.

SaxaVord Spaceport 
On 7 February 2021, Lockheed Martin and the United Kingdom announced a contract with ABL to launch the UK Pathfinder mission (6 CubeSats) in 2022, from the Shetland Space Centre on the island of Unst, Scotland. As of June 2022, the UK Pathfinder launch is scheduled to take place in early 2023.

Launches

RS1 rocket 
Both stages are powered by ABL's E2 rocket engine, with nine in the first stage, and one in the second stage. They are powered by RP-1 kerosene and liquid oxygen (LOX) as the oxidizer as propellants.

The containerized launch system and rocket can be deployed to and launched from a suitably flat site, the main requirements being access for trucks capable of carrying up to -long ISO containers (for the RS-1 first stage), and a flat concrete pad  x .

 ABL Space Systems was planning the first orbital launch of its RS1 rocket in 2022. The firm received contracts worth US$44.5 million from the United States Air Force, as well as private funding equaling US$49 million. According to Dan Piemont, the US$44.5 million Air Force contracts include a one-year deal from the tech incubator AFWERX to demonstrate launch technology and an agreement with Space and Missile Systems Center's Space Enterprise Consortium to conduct three demonstrations of a RS1 vehicle variant and deployable ground infrastructure in 2022.

Launches are planned to be sold for US$12 million per flight.

The maiden flight on January 10, 2023, failed.

Previous design 
In 2019, RS-1 was planned to have three E1 engines, each producing  of thrust to power the rocket's first stage. Both engines would use liquid oxygen and RP-1 propellants. The first development build of the vehicle has been completed.

See also
Rocket Lab
Virgin Orbit
Firefly Aerospace

References

External links 
 
 RS-1 rocket details
 launch system details

Private spaceflight companies
Commercial launch service providers
Rocket engine manufacturers of the United States
Aerospace companies of the United States
Companies based in El Segundo, California
Aerospace technologies
Rocket engines